Shake, Rattle & Roll III is a 1991 Filipino horror anthology film and the third installment of the Shake, Rattle & Roll film series. It was distributed by Regal Films, and was directed by Peque Gallaga and Lore Reyes. The film is an entry of the 1991 Metro Manila Film Festival.

The fourth installment, Shake, Rattle & Roll IV, was released in 1992.

Plot

"Yaya"
Tanya (Kris Aquino) is a mother that has moved to a new house with her baby daughter, Jane. Everything was fine until the house fell victim to a blackout. Tanya, worried about Jane, decides to check on her daughter along with her mother, Lydia (Rosemarie Gil). She finds her housekeeper, Virgie (Mae-Ann Adonis), who had been driven insane, hiding in a closet with Jane. Tanya grabs Jane but Virgie warns her that someone will take her baby.

After Tanya sends Virgie away, an old spirit who had passed in the house watched her. Tanya hires a new nanny, Aida (Eva Ramos). When a strong wind blows into the house, Aida asks Tanya to see Jane. When they do, Aida tells Tanya that she can sense that there is an evil spirit in their house and that the grounds the house was built on was used as a sacrificial ground for people of all ages. Aida decides to leave and asks Tanya to do the same. If they don't, she advises them to close all the exits, never let the spirit enter, and never leave Jane alone by herself.

That night, Tanya calls someone on the phone but the wind blows again. Tanya decides to open the door out of suspicion and is greeted by the spirit (Lilia Cuntapay). As she tries to back up, the wind destroys the house's Christmas tree, explodes all the lights, and breaks everything. Suddenly, Tanya remembers Jane and runs to her room. As she tries to find portable light, the spirit appears in Jane's room, so Tanya decides to reason with her. When the spirit suddenly disappears, Tanya brings Jane with her to go back to Lydia's home.

After a few hours, Tanya tells Lydia what happened but Lydia doesn't believe her. Lydia decides to instruct Chuck (Ogie Alcasid), Tanya's brother, to drive Tanya and Jane back home but Chuck refuses since it's nighttime and it's too late. Later, Tanya dreams about the spirit and wakes up. She decides to sleep on the bed next to Jane.

The next morning, Tanya and Chuck arrive back to Tanya's house. Tanya decides she'll stay in the car since she's too scared to go inside, so she instructs Chuck to bring the essentials they need instead. While Chuck is inside, the wind blows again. Tanya, inside the car, decides to roll up the windows but is still attacked by the spirit trying to enter. Tanya, scared, decides to honk the car horn to call Chuck. Chuck goes to the car but the spirit has already disappeared.

Chuck tells Tanya to give him the key to open the car's boot. After this, Tanya and Chuck go back to Lydia's home. As they get their stuff, the car door suddenly opens on its own. Tanya realizes that she didn't close the car door after putting the stuff inside the boot, letting the spirit inside the car. Realizing her mistake, she rushes inside the house to save Jane. As she enters the room, the spirit appears, holding Jane in her hands. Tanya cries out her name and the episode ends.

"Ate"
Rosalyn (Janice de Belen), a teacher, and her colleagues are watching a TV show at a school cafeteria talking about a person being able to revive the dead. The reporter ends the interview even before getting to the actual root of the story. During this, Rosalyn is called by the school's principal (Joey Reyes) and is told that her older sister, Rowena (Gina Alajar), has already died and wrote a suicide note, given to Fr. Salazar (Pen Medina), who gave Rowena her last communion.

The next day, Rosalyn arrives in a remote part of her province and arrives to where Rowena is staying. She also meets a boy, saying that her sister is already dead. Inside the house, she finds a coffin at the main hallway with no one inside. She also finds Rowena walking outside in a white dress. When Rosalyn rejoices and hugs Rowena though, Rowena doesn't show emotions and digs the ground, putting it on her body.

Suddenly, Mrs. Redoblado (Armida Siguion-Reyna), the wife of Rowena's doctor (Subas Herrero), arrives and catches Rosalyn and Rowena on the ground. Mrs. Redoblado tells Rosalyn that Rowena is sick and that the coffin inside the house was for Rowena, since they thought she wouldn't survive her sickness. She also asks where Milton (Joel Torre), Rowena's husband and the doctor's son, is, but Mrs. Redoblado tells her that he already left. 

During dinner, Rosalyn tries to feed Rowena food other than soup but is stopped by the doctor's servant named Kardo (Cris Daluz). The doctor tells her that it's fine but Rowena suddenly begins to move differently, so the doctor and his servant try to cure her. Rosalyn wants to check what is happening but is stopped by the doctor's wife.

At nighttime, she decides to check up on Rowena and asks her what's going on. Rowena doesn't talk but looks at the plant in her room instead. She suddenly puts the plant's roots on her face and tries to eat the soil. Rosalyn tries to stop her but she realizes Rowena is chained to her bed. Mrs. Redoblado appears and tells Rosalyn that Rowena is still not feeling well and she might hurt herself at night when she walks around the house, so she's chained up. Rosalyn tries to ask more questions about Rowena about Mrs. Redoblado tells her that she might be too worried for her sister and that she should roam around town, then she locks Rowena's room, much to Rosalyn's shock.

The next day, she talks to the boy, named Tano (Cris Balase), that told her Rowena's dead. Tano tells her that Rowena is truly dead and that dead people should be buried in the ground. Rosalyn and Tano roam around the town's cemetery. They come across Rowena's supposed-to-be burial ground with someone digging a hole.

At the town's church, Rosalyn talks to Fr. Salazar about Rowena's case. Fr. Salazar tells her that Rowena is truly dead. He talks about things that can't be explained, like miracles, which are perfect miracles because God made it happen. On Rowena's case, her miracle isn't perfect, since she can't talk or move completely fine, which is a case of a miracle made by a bad spirit. Fr. Salazar also explains that Rowena is putting dirt on her body because she's supposed to be buried in the ground.

In a room inside the doctor's mansion, she finds a chapel, led by Dr. Redoblado. On the upper part of the mansion, she finally finds Milton. Milton tells her that Dr. Redoblado is only resurrecting her from the dead using the Devil's power and Rowena can only be at peace when the doctor and his wife are dead. He can't do it himself because he doesn't have the strength to kill his own parents. He tells Rosalyn to kill them to put poison in their food.

That night, while no one is looking, Rosalyn successfully puts the poison inside with Milton's help. However, during dinner, Dr. Redoblado and his wife don't drink the soup and forces Rosalyn to do it instead. It's revealed that he and his wife knew about her plan the entire time and that the soup they're eating isn't poisoned at all, since Kardo already threw the soup with poison away. The doctor orders  Kardo to kill her since she knows their secret. Rosalyn is able to escape and go to her sister's room.

Inside Rowena's room, Rosalyn tries to remove Rowena's chains, but is attacked by Rowena, thinking she's the doctor and his wife. Rosalyn talks to sister to meet at the cemetery to bury her. Tano reunites with Rosalyn inside the mansion and helps Rowena. Outside the mansion, Dr. Redoblado and his wife order the servants to look for them inside. However, they let Rosalyn, Rowena and Tano escape.

At the cemetery, Rowena goes inside the hole dug by the man earlier. Suddenly, Dr. Redoblado and his servants surround the three of them, with his wife capturing Rosalyn. Tano successfully throws wood at Mrs. Redoblado's face and she dies. Dr. Redoblado tries to kill Rosalyn, but is dragged down the ground by Rowena and is choked to death. Rowena finally dies peacefully and Rosalyn tries to cover the hole. Milton, who escaped the mansion, decides to bury Dr. Redoblado and Rowena himself, happy that his wife is finally at peace.

"Nanay"
Maloy (Manilyn Reynes) a nature-loving but troubled and dolt science girl who is constantly harassed by her dormmates, led by Dezzi Rae (Ai-Ai delas Alas), is having a field trip with her classmates and teachers in a local lake for their science project. Maloy's best friend Sally (Candy Pangilinan) found strange eggs found in the lake. After Sally gave the eggs to Maloy, they hear a disturbing voice from the lake. As Sally was swimming in the lake, an unknown sea creature drowns her. After the teachers and students recover her dead body, Maloy suspects her friend's dead body covered in moss and gunk. Before they leave, the creature resurfaces out of the lake and enters in one of Maloy's coolers.

After Maloy returns to the dormitory, the strict dormitory owner Eba (Vangie Labalan) warns her about going to the lake. Eba explains to her about a mysterious sea creature living in the lake; the Undin, a water-nymph sea creature living in the water. Whenever someone disturbs them, especially their belongings and eggs, they kill them. Maloy realizes that Sally had stolen the eggs she found from the Undin before her death but Eba assures that her story was told by her grandmother. As Eba leaves, the Undin jumps out of the cooler. Maloy grabs the eggs and tried to call the Undin to give the eggs back to her but the Undin was hiding from her. Eba and the dorm mates appear at the kitchen and Maloy tries to convince them that the Undin was real, but they do not believe in her.

As Dezzi Rae had a party with her dorm mates and their friends at the dormitory, Maloy began to use the dormitory's bathroom to take a shower. The Undin, who had moved already to the bathroom, kills Eba and one of the party-goers, Ojay (Joey Marquez), by spitting them with her acidic saliva after Maloy witnessed Ojay's body melting. She noticed the Undin appeared and took the eggs to call the creature but Dezzi Rae and her friends appear. Maloy tried to convince them that the Undin was here and explained to them of Ojay's death. She showed them the eggs but Dezzi Rae grabs the eggs from her and she and her friends began playing with them. Dezzi Rae forced Maloy to watch as she began destroying the eggs. Maloy manages to break free from the group and overpowers Dezzi Rae. As she and her friends leave the bathroom, Maloy finds one of the Undin's eggs remained. The Undin, enraged by the death of her children, kills Dezzi Rae and her friends. Maloy overhears the group's screams, enters the dormitory and watches the Undin kill Dezzi Rae's friends. Maloy calls the Undin and knows that she was a mother. Maloy confesses to the Undin that she & Sally never meant to steal her eggs and knows about a mother's life. Maloy began to give the egg back to the Undin and puts her back to the cooler, where Maloy encountered the creature earlier, to bring her back to the lake.

Maloy returns to the lake to bring the Undin back home. After bidding farewell to Maloy, the Undin reunites with her mate as they swim away back to their home.

Cast

Yaya
Kris Aquino as Tanya 
Lilia Cuntapay as the Spirit
Rosemarie Gil as Lydia
Ogie Alcasid as Chuck
Mae-Ann Adonis as Virgie
Eva Ramos as Aida

Ate
Janice de Belen as Rosalyn
Gina Alajar as Rowena
Joel Torre as Milton Redoblado
Armida Siguion-Reyna as Mrs. Redoblado
Subas Herrero as Dr. Redoblado
Inday Badiday as herself 
Pen Medina as Fr. Salazar
Lucy Quinto as Madame Sabrina
Cris Daluz as Kardo
Joey Reyes as Principal
Cris Balase as Tano
Jomari Yllana as Student

Nanay
Manilyn Reynes as Maloy
Joey Marquez as Ojay
Ai-Ai de las Alas as Dezzi Rae
Vangie Labalan as Mama Eba/Mommy Ems
Richard Cepeda as Borg
Manny Castañeda as Terry
Candy Pangilinan as Sally
Agnes Ventura as Lalaine
Roxanne Silverio as Tweetie
Marlene Aguilar as Shasha
Mart Kenneth Rebamonte as Mang Kanor

See also
Shake, Rattle & Roll (film series)
List of ghost films

External links

1991 horror films
1991 films
Philippine horror films
1990s comedy horror films
Regal Entertainment films
1991 comedy films
Films directed by Peque Gallaga
Films directed by Lore Reyes